The Kanozero Petroglyphs are a set of rock drawings discovered in 1997 on an island in Lake Kanozero in the southwestern part of the Kola Peninsula in Murmansk Oblast, Russia. The petroglyphs have been dated to the 2nd and 3rd millennium BC.  There are currently about 1300 different images discovered in 18 groups at the site. Their meaning is not yet deciphered.

See also
Compartment No. 6, a film featuring a visit to the petroglyphs

References 

 Past Horizons: Remarkable Russian Petroglyphs
 Petroglyphs of the White Sea Coast
 Protecting the Kanozero Petroglyphs
 The Kanozero Petroglyphs
 Tegnefilm fra steinalderen 

Buildings and structures in Murmansk Oblast
Archaeological sites in Russia
Rock art in Europe
Petroglyphs
Cultural heritage monuments in Murmansk Oblast
Objects of cultural heritage of Russia of federal significance
Culture of Murmansk Oblast